Geufer Rafael Hallmann known as Geufer born on 6 December 1980 in Estância Velha, Brazil is a Brazilian footballer who plays for Portuguese team Camacha as a striker in the Portuguese Second Division Serie A. His previous clubs include Juventude, São Bento, União Leiria, União Madeira, Fortaleza, Nacional and Villa Nova.

References

Living people
1980 births
Brazilian footballers
C.F. União players
Brazilian people of German descent
Association football forwards